The following is a list of bolides and fireballs seen on Earth in recent times. These are small asteroids (known as meteoroids) that regularly impact the Earth. Although most are so small that they burn up in the atmosphere before reaching the surface, some larger objects may reach the surface as fragments, known as meteorites. A few of these are detected by NASA's Sentry system, in which case the impact is predicted.

Meteors with a recorded absolute magnitude are then converted to an asteroidal absolute magnitude under (Ma = Mm + 31) and then converted to a diameter assuming that meteoroids brighten by approximate 10 magnitudes when entering the atmosphere. Objects reported only to the American Meteor Society are only listed if observed by at least 100 people, and are cross-referenced with https://fireballs.ndc.nasa.gov if possible, to determine further physical characteristics. The fourth and third to last parameters are calculated from http://convertalot.com/asteroid_impact_calculator.html, assuming a density of 1.5 g/cm3, an impact angle of 45°, and a velocity of 17 km/s (if not provided). The actual values for both may vary by as much as the value itself, so be aware that these values are only estimates.

The bolide on 7 September 2015 is the 2015 Thailand bolide, and the bolide on 26 February 2015 may be related to the 2015 Kerala meteorite.

List

Notes

 NASA list of fireballs and bolides updated, interactive map from JPL

References

bolides